Azizabad (also Romanized as ‘Azīzābād) is a village in Gowdin Rural District, in the Central District of Kangavar County, Kermanshah Province, Iran. At the 2006 census, its population was 59, in 14 families.

References 

Populated places in Kangavar County